Robert's Coffee is a Finnish coffee roastery and coffee chain founded in 1987 by Robert Paulig, the former CEO of Paulig. Its selection includes original coffees, coffee blends, espresso coffees, spice coffees, decaffeinated coffee and tea. In 2014, the Paulig Group acquired the roastery and the Robert Paulig trademarks from Robert Paulig after long trademark disputes. The Robert's Coffee chain was not part of the deal and is still owned by the Robert Paulig family.

According to Robert's Coffee, it is the largest cafe chain in the Nordic countries. It has its own gourmet coffee roastery and its own coffee grades. For example, there are about 100 cafés in Finland, Sweden, Estonia, and even Turkey, Japan and Singapore.

See also
 Löfbergs

References

External links 

 Robert’s Coffee - Official Site
 

Coffeehouses and cafés
Companies of Finland